Chester R. Davis (February 27, 1896 – July 31, 1966) was an American businessman.

Biography
Davis was born in St. Charles, Illinois. He worked at the Ziegler Coal Company, and served in the 320th Infantry during World War I. He attended Lake Forest College and the University of Illinois. Immediately after graduating from UI, he became an assistant trust officer at the Chicago Title and Trust Company, where he was elected director and vice-president on January 10, 1939.

On February 19, 1954, he was nominated by President of the United States Dwight D. Eisenhower for the position of Assistant Secretary of the Army (Financial Management and Comptroller). The US Senate Armed Services Committee approved the nomination on March 4, 1955.

Davis served for two years as Assistant Secretary during which he developed a plan for medical and hospital care for the armed forces.  For his "lasting contributions" he was decorated in 1956-12-12. He resigned from that position on 1957-12-15.

After his resignation from government service, he returned to Chicago. In February 1957, he had been appointed to a subcommittee of the Committee of 49, a citizen's advisory committee that had been appointed by the Chicago Welfare Council. He had already served on a similar committee in 1952 to consider the affairs of the county hospital. At the time, he was a Republican.

He retired from Chicago Title and Trust in 1961. In 1963, he was named vice-president of the Association of the United States Army.

Davis died in 1966 of a heart attack in his home in Wayne, Illinois.

References

Further reading

External links
Papers of Chester R. Davis, Dwight D. Eisenhower Presidential Library

1896 births
1966 deaths
United States Army personnel of World War I
Lake Forest College alumni
United States Army soldiers
People from St. Charles, Illinois